The D52 road ( or RD52) is a road connecting Pont-Farcy and Vire in the Calvados département in France.

Routes départementales in France